Stadum is a municipality in the district of Nordfriesland, in Schleswig-Holstein, Germany.

Notable people
Rock musician Rio Reiser and his band Ton Steine Scherben moved to a farmstead at Fresenhagen in Stadum in 1975. Reiser lived there until his death in 1996. He was also buried on the farm under a special permit provided by Minister President Heide Simonis.

References

Nordfriesland